Norway competed at the 2002 Winter Paralympics in Salt Lake City, United States. 27 competitors from Norway won 19 medals, including 10 gold, 3 silver and 6 bronze and finished 3rd in the medal table.

See also 
 Norway at the Paralympics
 Norway at the 2002 Winter Olympics

References 

Norway at the Paralympics
2002 in Norwegian sport
Nations at the 2002 Winter Paralympics